Khezr may refer to:
 Khezr, Fars
 Khezr, Khuzestan
 Khidr